Sergei Alekseyevich Bespalykh (born 6 February 1973) is a former Russian professional football player and referee.

Honours
 Russian Third League Zone 3 top scorer: 1996 (25 goals).

Referee career
In 2005 and 2006, he worked as a referee, mostly in the Russian Second Division.

External links
 

1973 births
Footballers from Moscow
Living people
Soviet footballers
Russian footballers
Association football forwards
FC Chertanovo Moscow players
FC Dnipro players
FC Metalurh Novomoskovsk players
FC Spartak Ivano-Frankivsk players
FC Khutrovyk Tysmenytsia players
FC Dnipro-2 Dnipropetrovsk players
Kapaz PFK players
FC Yenisey Krasnoyarsk players
FC Tom Tomsk players
Ukrainian Premier League players
Azerbaijan Premier League players
Russian expatriate footballers
Expatriate footballers in Ukraine
Expatriate footballers in Azerbaijan
Russian football referees
Russian football managers
FC FShM Torpedo Moscow players
FC Lukhovitsy players